General elections were held in Bolivia on 4 January 1931, electing both a new President of the Republic and a new National Congress.

Results

President

Congress

References

Elections in Bolivia
Bolivia
Legislative election
Presidential elections in Bolivia
Election and referendum articles with incomplete results